Jens Charley Hultén (born 6 December 1963) is a Swedish actor.

Hultén is mainly known in Sweden for his parts in various TV crime dramas and perhaps best known for Graven and its sequel Morden, as well as his part in Kommissarie Winter based on best selling crime writer Åke Edwardsons novels. Another notable role was as the gangster Seth Rydell in the Johan Falk films, next to Joel Kinnaman.  Perhaps his most well known English-speaking role is as Janik "the Bone Doctor" Vinter opposition Tom Cruise in the movie Mission Impossible 5 -- Rogue Nation.

Hultén also appeared in the 2012 Bond film Skyfall as one of Silva's thugs, the one who falls with Bond in a frozen lake.

Filmography

References

External links
 AGENTBOLAGET – Jens Hultén
 Svensk Filmdatabas – Jens Hultén
 

1963 births
Living people
Swedish male television actors
Swedish male film actors
21st-century Swedish male actors
Male actors from Stockholm
20th-century Swedish male actors